Up to You may refer to:

Music
Up to You (album), by Michi 2009
Up to You (EP), by Canadian band Blue Peter 1982

Songs
"Up to You", song by Chris Brown from F.A.M.E. 2011
"Up to You", song by Boz Scaggs single from Boz Scaggs & Band	1972
"Up to You", song by Kéllé Bryan
"Up to You", song by Toryn Green
"Up to You", song by Savatage from Streets: A Rock Opera
"Up to You", song by Yo La Tengo Genius + Love = Yo La Tengo  
"Up to You", song by David Kitt from Not Fade Away (David Kitt album)
"Up to You", song by FM from City of Fear 1980
"Up to You", song by Sidewinder (band)
"Up to You", song by Section 25 single 1980
"Up to You", song by Satoshi Ohno
"Up to You", song by Juliana Hatfield discography
"Up to You", song by Ivan Neville single from If My Ancestors Could See Me Now 1988
"Up to You", song by Subseven Free to Conquer 2005
"Up to You", song by Martha Velez  	1977
"Up to You", song by Uncanny X-Men (band)	1983